Sirius is a 1975 Czechoslovak war drama film directed by František Vláčil. The film has won many awards. It was Vláčil's last film before returning to feature-length films.

Plot
The film is a story of 12-year-old Fanek and his dog Sirius. They play together every day. One day German train is destroyed by local resistance and Germans decide to confiscate dogs of local folks. Fanek doesn't want to give up Sirius and hides him in the woods. One day, Sirius escapes from his fence. Fanek asks the gamekeeper for help. He can do only one thing - shoot Sirius.

Cast
Michal Vavruša as Fanek
Jana Hlaváčková as Fanek's Mother
Vladimír Jedenáctík as Gamekeeper
Karel Chromík as Fanek's Father
Karel Hábl as SS Officer
Bořivoj Navrátil as Gestapo Officer

Reception

Accolades

References

External links
 

1975 films
Czech children's films
1970s war drama films
Czech war drama films
1970s Czech-language films
Czech resistance to Nazi occupation in film
Films directed by František Vláčil
Czechoslovak drama films
1975 drama films
Czech World War II films
Czechoslovak World War II films
1975 war films
1970s Czech films